Ensign most often refers to:

 Ensign (flag), a flag flown on a vessel to indicate nationality
 Ensign (rank), a navy (and former army) officer rank

Ensign or The Ensign may also refer to:

Places
 Ensign, Alberta, Alberta, Canada
 Ensign, Kansas
 Ensign Lake, a lake in Minnesota
 Ensign Peak, Utah
 Ensign Township, Michigan
 Ensign Township, North Dakota (near Glenburn)

Transportation
 Pearson Ensign, a class of full-keel sailboats
 , a United States Navy patrol boat in commission from 1917 to 1919
 Armstrong Whitworth Ensign, a class of British airliner, and the name of the first example
Ensignbus, a bus company in England
Ensign Manufacturing Company, a defunct railroad car manufacturing company in West Virginia

Music
 Ensign (band), a hardcore punk band
 Ensign (EP), the band's eponymous 1996 release
 Ensign Records, British record label, now part of EMI

Newspapers and magazines
 The Ensign (newspaper), a newspaper published by Allied Press serving Gore, New Zealand
 Ensign (LDS magazine), a former magazine of The Church of Jesus Christ of Latter-day Saints
 The Ensign (USPS magazine), the official magazine of the United States Power Squadrons

Other uses
 Ensign (surname)
 Ensign Racing, a defunct Formula One team
 Ensign Energy Services, a Calgary-based oil well drilling and servicing company
The Ensign (video game), a text-based iOS video game
 Ensign, the botanical author abbreviation for Margaret Ruth Ensign